Ņikita Koļesovs (born 25 September 1996) is a Latvian football player.

International
He made his debut for the Latvia national football team on 9 June 2017 in a World Cup qualifier group game against Portugal.

References

External links
 
 

1996 births
Living people
Latvian people of Russian descent
Latvian footballers
Latvia youth international footballers
Latvia under-21 international footballers
Latvia international footballers
Association football defenders
Latvian Higher League players
FK Ventspils players
Liga I players
FC Botoșani players
Latvian expatriate footballers
Latvian expatriate sportspeople in Romania
Expatriate footballers in Romania